Beverly Priestman (born 29 April 1986) is an English professional football manager who is the current head coach of the Canada women's national team.

Early life
At age 12, Priestman signed-up for futsal in Consett, under John Herdman, who was at the time a university lecturer and a part-time football coach. Priestman graduated from Liverpool John Moores University and worked for Everton under Mo Marley.

Coaching career

Early career 
Priestman has coached Canada's U-17 and U-20 women's squads and was assistant coach for the Canada women's national soccer team under head coach Herdman. She coached England's women's U-17 squad, and she was assistant coach of the England women's national football team under head coach Phil Neville from 2018 to 2020.

Canada women 
In October 2020, Priestman was appointed as the head coach of Canada women's national soccer team, leading them to the gold medal in the Tokyo Olympics on August 6, 2021.

Personal life 
Priestman is married to Emma Humphries, a former midfielder with the New Zealand football team. Their son Jack was born in 2018.

Managerial statistics

Honours

Canada Women 

 Summer Olympics: 2020
 CONCACAF Women's Championship runner-up: 2022
Individual
 IFFHS Women's World Best National Coach: 2021

References

External links

1986 births
Association football coaches
Canada women's national soccer team managers
English expatriate football managers
English expatriates in Canada
English football managers
English LGBT sportspeople
Living people
Sportspeople from Consett
21st-century LGBT people